Dudley Triangle may also refer to a neighborhood of Boston, Massachusetts.
It consists of the numbers
 .

Dudley exhibited several rows of this triangle, and challenged readers to find the next row; the challenge was met by J. G. Mauldon, who proposed two different solutions. In one of Mauldon's solutions, the number at the intersection of the mth and nth diagonals (counting the top of the triangle as having m = n = 1) is given by the formula

Notes

References

Triangles of numbers